Aspas (also Romanized as Āspās and Āsopās; also known as Āsupās) is a village in Aspas Rural District, Sedeh District, Eqlid County, Fars Province, Iran. At the 2006 census, its population was 2,069, in 481 families.

Aspas is in the Zagros mountain range at an altitude of 2362 m.  It lies in the foothills above the Balengan valley between the Palangi range and the Abedīn range. Aspas means Strong Guard in Persian, and the village may have been named in honor of Aspas (Aspasia), the daughter of Artaxerxes II of Persia, who was also the commander of his secret police.

According to Thomas Herbert, who was in Safavid Iran in the first half of the 17th century, Aspas was inhabited by some 40,000 transplanted Christian Circassians and Georgians.

References

External links

 Map NH 39-7 Ardakan, Iran, Series 1501, Joint Operations Graphic (Air) 1:250,000, U.S. National Imagery and Mapping Agency 1st ed. reprinted May 2002.

Populated places in Eqlid County